Lilian Carp (born 12 October 1978) is a Moldovan politician currently serving as Member of the Moldovan Parliament since December 2014.

Notes 

 https://www.parlament.md/StructuraParlamentului/Deputa%C8%9Bii/tabid/87/Id/540/language/en-US/Default.aspx

Living people
Year of birth missing (living people)
Moldovan MPs 2014–2018
Moldovan MPs 2019–2023
Liberal Party (Moldova) MPs